The Del Mar Mile Stakes is a Grade III American Thoroughbred horse race for horses aged three years and older run over a distance of one mile on the turf held annually in August at Del Mar Racetrack in Del Mar, California. The event currently carries a purse of $150,000.

History

The event was inaugurated on 2 September 1987 with additional sponsorship from Budweiser and the Breeders' Cup at a distance of as a one mile race on the dirt track and was won by the 9-1 shot Good Command who was ridden by United States' Racing Hall of Fame jockey Chris McCarron in a time of 1:35. The following year the event was by Precisionist, the 1985 U.S. Champion Sprint Horse who had come out of retirement after an unsuccessful stud career. 

For the third running the event had been classified as Grade III and the next year in 1990 a Grade II, the current classification. 

Budweiser continued sponsorship until 1995 and the Breeders' Cup until 2006. After sponsorship ceased the event was renamed by the Del Mar administration to Del Mar Mile Handicap. 

In 2005 the event was moved from the dirt track to the turf.

In 2021 the conditions of the event were changed from a handicap to a stakes allowance.

Records
Speed  record:
1 mile (turf): 1:32.10 - Obviously (IRE) (2012) 
1 mile (dirt): 1:33.40 - On The Line (1989)  

Margins:
 5 lengths - Old Trieste (1998)

Most wins:
 2 - El Corredor (2000, 2001)
 2 - Obviously (IRE) (2012, 2013)
 2 - Mo Forza (2020, 2021)

Most wins by an owner:
 2 -  Hal J. Earnhardt  (2000, 2001)
 2 - Anthony Fanticola & Joseph Scardino (2012, 2013)
 2 -  	Bardy Farm & OG Boss (2020, 2021)

Most wins by a jockey:
 4 - Chris McCarron (1987, 1988, 1995, 1998)

Most wins by a trainer:
 3 - Bob Baffert (2000, 2001, 2002)
 3 - Philip D'Amato (2016, 2019, 2022)
 3 - John W. Sadler (2007, 2008, 2017)

Winners 

Legend:

See also
List of American and Canadian Graded races

External site
 2020 Del Mar Media Guide

References

Del Mar Racetrack
Horse races in California
Turf races in the United States
Open mile category horse races
Graded stakes races in the United States
Grade 2 stakes races in the United States
1987 establishments in California
Recurring sporting events established in 1987